Tushar Kumudrai Jani or Tushar Jani is a business entrepreneur, investor, philanthropist and the founder of Blue Dart Express Ltd and Blue Dart Aviation , Swift Freight and Express Industry Council of India (a courier and express cargo business association of all Indian companies). Swift Freight is India's first NVOCC business operator with a FMC registration in US, and Express Industry Council, is the first private custodian of courier loads in India, managing control over operations.

He created domestic courier terminals (for common user) at the airports of Mumbai, Delhi, Kolkata and Chennai, and international courier terminals (for common user) at Mumbai and Delhi airports of India. Tushar Jani is a member of the business session organizing committee, in the FIATA World Congress 2018, Delhi.

Career

Personal life
Tushar Jani was born on 29 April 1953. He completed a Bachelor of Science degree from the University of Mumbai. He has two daughters.
Tushar Jani is involved in the rehabilitation programs for the people affected by the earthquake, in Gujarat, via Tuberculosis Research Centre, at Bhavnagar.

References 

1969 births
Living people
20th-century Indian businesspeople
21st-century Indian businesspeople
Indian humanitarians
Indian philanthropists
Indian chief executives
Indian company founders
Businesspeople from Mumbai
University of Mumbai alumni